The Long March 6 or Chang Zheng 6 as in pinyin, abbreviated LM 6 for export or CZ 6 within China, is a Chinese liquid-fuelled launch vehicle of the Long March family, which was developed by the China Aerospace Science and Technology Corporation (CASC)  and the Shanghai Academy of Spaceflight Technology (SAST). The rocket was developed in the 2000s, and made its maiden flight in 2015. As one of the new generation rocket family, the Long March 6 was designed to be a light capacity, "high-speed response" rocket, complementing the heavy lift Long March 5 and the mid-heavy lift Long March 7 rocket families. It is capable of placing at least  of payload into a Sun-synchronous orbit. The first stage of the Long March 6 was derived from the booster rockets being developed for the Long March 5 rocket. It is powered by a YF-100 engine, which generates  of thrust from burning kerosene and LOX as rocket fuel and oxidiser. This was the first flight of the new engine design.

An enlarged variant, the Long March 6A, which has four strap-on solid boosters, an elongated stage one, a new stage two with the same diameter as the first stage, and a payload capacity of at least 4000 kg to Sun-synchronous orbit, made its maiden flight on 29 March 2022.

Launch statistics

List of launches

See also 

 Comparison of orbital launchers families
 Comparison of orbital launch systems

References 

Long March (rocket family)
Spacecraft launched in 2015
2015 in spaceflight
2015 in China
Vehicles introduced in 2015